Kongunadu Arts and Science College, is an autonomous arts and science college located at Coimbatore, Tamil Nadu. The college is affiliated with Bharathiar University. The college has been recognized as the 'College of Excellence' by the University Grants Commission and ranked among the best colleges in India.

Departments

Science
Physics
Chemistry
Mathematics
Computer Science
Computer Application
Biochemistry
Biotechnology
Botany
Zoology

Arts and Commerce
Tamil
English
Library Science
Costume Design and Fashion
Physical Education
Commerce
b.com (PA)

Accreditation
In the third cycle of re-accreditation, the National Assessment and Accreditation Council has awarded the college with an 'A' grade (CGPA of 3.64 out of 4).

References

External links

Colleges affiliated to Bharathiar University
Academic institutions formerly affiliated with the University of Madras